The American Osteopathic Board of Orthopedic Surgery (AOBOS) is an organization that provides board certification to qualified Doctors of Osteopathic Medicine (D.O.) who specialize in the medical and surgical treatment of disorders of the musculoskeletal system (orthopedic surgeons). The board is one of 18 medical specialty certifying boards of the American Osteopathic Association Bureau of Osteopathic Specialists approved by the American Osteopathic Association (AOA), and was originally a subdivision of the American Osteopathic Board of Surgery until it became an independent board in 1978. As of December 2011, 1,082 osteopathic orthopedic surgeons held active certification with the AOBOS. Additionally, diplomates of the American Osteopathic Board of Orthopedic Surgery are eligible for membership in the American Society for Surgery of the Hand and the American Academy of Orthopaedic Surgeons.

Board certification
To become board certified in orthopedic surgery, candidates must have completed an AOA-approved residency in orthopedic surgery and one year of practice following the completion of residency. Additionally, candidates must have performed at least 200 major orthopedic surgeries in the year preceding application for board certification, and successfully completed the required clinical, oral, and written exams. Since 1994, board certified osteopathic orthopedic surgeons must renew their certification every ten years to avoid expiration of their board certification status.

Board certified osteopathic orthopedic surgeons may also receive Certification of Added Qualifications (CAQ) in Orthopedic Sports Medicine and Hand Surgery. Osteopathic orthopedic surgeons must renew their CAQ credentials every ten years.

See also
American Osteopathic Association Bureau of Osteopathic Specialists

References

External links
AOBOS homepage

Surgical organizations based in the United States
Organizations established in 1978
Orthopedic organizations
Osteopathic medical associations in the United States
Medical and health organizations based in Michigan
1978 establishments in the United States